Infused righteousness forms the basis for the doctrine of justification in the Roman Catholic Church and is rooted in the theology of Thomas Aquinas. The doctrine states that through keeping the commands of Christ, regular confession and penance, and receiving the sacraments, God's grace/righteousness is "infused" in believers more and more over time, and their own "righteousness in the flesh" becomes subsumed into God's righteousness.

See also 

Imparted righteousness
Imputed righteousness

External links 
Christian Classics Ethereal Library:  Righteousness - Imputed, Imparted or Infused?
Theopedia: Infused Righteousness

Salvation in Catholicism
Catholic theology and doctrine
Christian terminology
Thomism